Tom Anderson is an American producer and screenwriter. He won a Primetime Emmy Award and was nominated for three more in the category Outstanding Comedy Series for his work on the television program Cheers. Anderson produced and wrote for television programs including Living Single, Kevin Can Wait, Something Wilder, Newhart and The Jeff Foxworthy Show.

Anderson is the brother of the former mayor of Willoughby, Ohio, David Anderson.

References

External links 

Living people
Place of birth missing (living people)
Year of birth missing (living people)
American male screenwriters
American television writers
American male television writers
American television producers
20th-century American screenwriters
Primetime Emmy Award winners